Tian can mean:
Tian (天), a Chinese religious concept, often translated as "Heaven"
Tian (dish), an earthenware vessel of Provence, and the dishes prepared in it
Tian, Benin, a village in Benin
Tian, Iran (disambiguation), 2 places in Lorestan province in Iran
Tian (surname), a Chinese surname (田)